Chrobry Głogów is a Polish football club based in Głogów, Poland. It was founded in 1946. The team's official colors are orange and black. Chrobry currently competes in I liga, the second tier of Polish league football. The club's name commemorates Polish King Bolesław I the Brave, who ruled Poland from 992 to 1025.

Current squad

References

External links 
 Official website 
 Chrobry Glogow's supporters website 
 Chrobry Głogów (90minut.pl) 

Głogów County
Football clubs in Lower Silesian Voivodeship
Association football clubs established in 1946
1946 establishments in Poland